KTEL (1490 kHz, "Fox News Radio") is an AM radio station broadcasting a news/talk format. Licensed to Walla Walla, Washington, United States, the station is currently owned by Randolph and Debra McKone's Elkhorn Media Group, through its licensee EMG2, LLC, and features programming from Citadel Media, ESPN Radio, and Premiere Radio Networks.  The station was founded by Jack Keating in the 1950s.

References

External links

KTEL on RadioMixer

TEL
News and talk radio stations in the United States
Walla Walla, Washington
Radio stations established in 1960